The 1946–47 season was Cardiff City F.C.'s 20th season in the Football League. They competed in the 24-team Division Three South, then the third tier of English football, finishing first and gaining promotion to the Second Division.

Season review

Football League Third Division South

Partial league table

Results by round

Players
First team squad.

Fixtures and results

Third Division South

Source

FA Cup

Source

Welsh Cup

Source

See also

List of Cardiff City F.C. seasons

References

Bibliography

Cardiff City F.C. seasons
Association football clubs 1946–47 season
Card